The following list contains the upraisings in Hungary, the Kingdom of Hungary and the Principality of Transylvania in chronological order.

1046 – Vata pagan uprising
1061 – Second pagan uprising in Hungary
1437 – Transylvanian peasant revolt led by Antal Nagy de Buda
1492–93 – Revolt of the Black Army of Hungary
1514 – Peasant revolt led by György Dózsa
1526 – 1527 – Revolt led by Jovan Nenad
1572 – Croatian–Slovene Peasant Revolt
1562, 1575, 1595–96 – Szekler uprisings
1604 – Stephen Bocskai's revolt
1631 – 1632 – Revolt led by Peter Császár
1672 - First kuruc uprising
1678 – Emeric Thököly's uprising
1697 – 
1703 – Rákóczi's War of Independence
1735 – 1736 – Uprising of Pera Segedinac
1784 – Revolt of Horea, Cloșca and Crișan
1831 – Cholera uprising in Hungary
1848 – Hungarian Revolution of 1848
1918 – Aster Revolution
1921 – Uprising in West Hungary
1956 – Hungarian Revolution of 1956

Hungary history-related lists